Leslie Harry Compton (12 September 1912 – 27 December 1984) was an English sportsman who played football and cricket for Arsenal and Middlesex, respectively. He gained two England caps late in his football career, and remains the oldest outfield player to debut for England (and the oldest post-war debutant in any position). His brother, Denis, was also a footballer and cricketer for Arsenal and Middlesex, though Leslie was more successful in football and Denis in cricket.

Football career

Compton was born Woodford, Essex and played football for Middlesex Schools before joining Arsenal as an amateur in 1930. He would spend his entire senior club career at Arsenal, over a period of 22 years, making him one of the club's longest-ever serving players. He made his debut on 24 April 1932 against Aston Villa in a 1–1 draw at Villa Park, two months after he had turned professional.

He started out as a right-back, and deputised for Tom Parker in the early 1930s, before George Male was converted to that position and became Parker's long-term replacement. Relegated to reserve team football, Compton only played 13 first-team games in four seasons. By 1935–36 he had started to feature more regularly, playing 12 games that season and 15 the next, but missed out on a First Division winners' medal in 1937–38 as he only managed 9 appearances that season.

Despite being down the pecking order throughout the 1930s and missing out on the success that Arsenal enjoyed, Compton stuck with Arsenal and won a Charity Shield winners' medal in 1938–39, playing 19 times that season. However the Second World War then intervened; Compton served in the Army while continuing to play football for Arsenal. Converted to an emergency centre-forward, he once scored ten times in a wartime match against Leyton Orient, which finished 15–2 to Arsenal. He also guested for Chester, scoring a hat-trick against Everton during the 1942–43 season. In June 1940, he was one of five Arsenal players who guested for Southampton in a victory over Fulham at Craven Cottage.

After the war had ended, he reverted to defence, becoming a mainstay in the Arsenal side at centre half. Although he missed the first six games of the 1947–48 due to cricketing commitments but was a near ever-present for the remainder of the season, as Arsenal won the First Division title and Compton finally earned a top-class honour; his brother, Denis, had also by this time established himself in the Arsenal side and won a medal as well. During the close season, he succeeded Joe Mercer as Arsenal captain, but relinquished the armband soon after, saying Mercer deserved the honour more.

Compton went on to win the FA Cup in 1949–50, scoring a last-minute equaliser in the Gunners' semi-final against Chelsea, heading a corner kick from his brother Denis to level the match 2–2; Arsenal won the replay 1–0, and then beat Liverpool in the final. Compton's form was such that he was selected for England for their match against Wales on 15 November 1950, making him, at 38 years and 64 days, the oldest post-war England debutant and the oldest ever outfield player to debut. These records still stand. Alexander Morten holds the all-time record.

He was a regular in the Arsenal side until the start of the 1951–52 season, during which he only played four matches. He decided to retire from playing football in the 1952 close season; in total he played 273 matches and scored 6 goals. He stayed on at Arsenal for another three years as a coach and scout.

Cricket career

Compton also played cricket for Middlesex, often playing as wicket-keeper from 1938 to 1956. He appeared 272 times, scoring 5,814 runs (an average of 16.75), and taking 468 catches and 131 stumpings for the county. Together with his brother, he won the 1947 County Championship title with Middlesex, making them the only brothers ever to have won the national title both in football and cricket. Unlike Denis though, Leslie never played Test cricket for England.

Retirement and death

After retiring he ran "Hanley Arms" pub in Hornsey Road, north London. He died in Hendon in December 1984, from complications due to diabetes, aged 72; his foot had been amputated two years previously because of this. He was cremated at the Golders Green Crematorium where his ashes remain.

Honours
Arsenal
First Division: 1947–48 
FA Cup: 1950
FA Charity Shield: 1938, 1948

References

External links

 

1912 births
1984 deaths
Footballers from Woodford, London
Cricketers from Greater London
English cricketers
English footballers
England international footballers
England wartime international footballers
London Counties cricketers
Arsenal F.C. players
Middlesex cricketers
Arsenal F.C. non-playing staff
Deaths from diabetes
Chester City F.C. wartime guest players
York City F.C. wartime guest players
English Football League players
Southampton F.C. wartime guest players
English Football League representative players
Golders Green Crematorium
Marylebone Cricket Club cricketers
Association football central defenders
Association football fullbacks
North v South cricketers
FA Cup Final players
British Army personnel of World War II
English disabled sportspeople
Sportspeople with limb difference
English amputees
Wicket-keepers